Childhood, subtitled A journal of global child research, is a quarterly peer-reviewed academic journal publishing research in the field of childhood studies. It was established in 1993 and is published by SAGE Publications on behalf of the Norwegian Centre for Child Research. The journal's editors-in-chief are Leena Alanen (University of Jyvaskyla), Daniel Thomas Cook (Rutgers University), Virginia Morrow (University of Oxford), and Olga Nieuwenhuys (University of Amsterdam). It publishes theoretical and empirical research articles, reviews, and commentaries on children's social relations and culture, with an emphasis on their rights and generational position in society.

Abstracting and indexing 
Childhood is abstracted and indexed in: Current Contents, British Humanities Index, Scopus, the British Education Index, and the Social Sciences Citation Index. According to the Journal Citation Reports, its 2010 impact factor is 1.061, ranking it 20th out of 83 journals in the category "Social Sciences, Interdisciplinary".

References

External links 
 

SAGE Publishing academic journals
Quarterly journals
English-language journals
Publications established in 1993
Sociology journals